Fate/Zero is an anime series based on the prequel light novels to Type-Moon's visual novel, Fate/stay night. The novels are written by Gen Urobuchi, who is also known as the writer for the anime Puella Magi Madoka Magica, and illustrated by Takashi Takeuchi, co-founder and main artist of Type-Moon.

Set ten years before the events of Fate/stay night, the anime tells the story of the Fourth Holy Grail War, a secret magical tournament held in Fuyuki City, Japan where seven magicians known as Masters summon Servants, reincarnations of legendary souls and heroes from all across time, where they fight in a deadly battle royale where the winner obtains the Holy Grail, a magical legendary chalice capable of granting wishes. Its characters include both younger versions of characters in Fate/stay night, their parents and relatives, and original characters. Fate/Zeros main protagonist, Kiritsugu Emiya, the foster father of Fate/stay nights protagonist, Shirou Emiya, is known as a merciless mage killer who joins the tournament on behalf of his wife's family, the Einzberns.

The anime is jointly produced by Aniplex, Nitroplus, Notes, Seikaisha, and Ufotable. It is also directed by Ei Aoki; produced by Atsuhiro Iwakami; music by Yuki Kajiura; character design by Atsushi Ikariya and Tomonori Sudou; and art, 3D, and photography directions by Koji Eto, Kōjirō Shishido, and Yuichi Terao respectively. The anime premiered on Tokyo MX, Tochigi TV, and Gunma TV, with the first season airing from October 1 to December 24, 2011 and later dates on Television Saitama, Aichi Television Broadcasting, MBS, CTC, tvk, TVh, TVQ, BS11 and Kids Station. The second season aired from April 7 to June 23, 2012. In the first season, the opening theme song was "Oath Sign" by LiSA and the ending theme was "Memoria" by Eir Aoi. The song  by Kalafina was used as a special ending theme song in episodes 18 and 19.



Episode list

First season

Second season

References

External links
 Fate/Zero Aniplex USA website
 Fate/Zero Aniplex website  
 Fate/Zero Official website  
 
 

Fate/Zero